Knucklebean is an album by jazz vibraphone and marimba player Bobby Hutcherson. It was released in 1977 by Blue Note Records. The musicians were Hutcherson's regular band plus guests Freddie Hubbard and Hadley Caliman.

Track listing

Side A 
"Why Not" – 5:22 (George Cables)
"Sundance Knows" – 6:34 (Eddie Marshall)
"So Far, So Good" – 4:39 (James Leary)

Side B 
"Little B's Poem" – 4:43 (Bobby Hutcherson)
"'Til Then" – 4:05 (Hutcherson)
"Knucklebean"" – 7:12 (Marshall)

Personnel 
Bobby Hutcherson – vibraphone, marimba
Freddie Hubbard – trumpet
George Cables – acoustic and electric piano
Manny Boyd – flute, soprano and tenor saxophone
Hadley Caliman – flute and tenor saxophone
James Leary – bass
Eddie Marshall – drums

References 

1977 albums
Blue Note Records albums
Bobby Hutcherson albums